Western Missouri Correctional Center (WMCC) is a Missouri Department of Corrections state prison for men located in Cameron, DeKalb County, Missouri.  (The town of Cameron straddles DeKalb and Clinton Counties.)   According to the Official Manual State of Missouri the facility has a capacity of 1925 medium security prisoners.  

The facility opened in 1988 and is immediately adjacent to the Crossroads Correctional Center (CRCC), a maximum security facility for men which opened in 1997. Crossroads was closed in July 2019 and one side of WMCC was converted into a maximum security prison, receiving many of those formerly held at CRCC.

Notable inmates
Michael J. Devlin - kidnapper and child molester
Lorenzo Gilyard - serial killer
Clifton Ray - serial killer

References

Prisons in Missouri
Buildings and structures in DeKalb County, Missouri
1988 establishments in Missouri